Y Rhedegydd (established in 1878) was a weekly Welsh language newspaper distributed around Blaenau Ffestiniog and districts of Caernarfonshire and Meirionethshire. 

It contained mainly local news and information.

References

Newspapers published in Wales
Publications established in 1878